The Bristol + Bath Marathon was planned to be an annual marathon held between the cities of Bristol and Bath in the United Kingdom. It was held once in 2015 before the events in 2016 and 2017 were both cancelled. No further events were arranged after the 2017 edition.

Route
The course began in Bristol city centre and followed much of the route of the Bristol Half Marathon, passing under the Clifton Suspension Bridge. It then headed eastwards out of the city, following the A431 to Bath, finishing in Royal Victoria Park.

Cancellations
Despite the inaugural race being considered a success, the 2016 edition was cancelled due to the race organisers being unable to secure the road closures necessary for the race to be held safely. The second running of the event was then scheduled for 22 October 2017, but was also cancelled due to "other events and road closure requirements across the cities". No date was set for any events after 2017.

Past winners

Key:

References

Sports competitions in Bristol
Sport in Bath, Somerset
Marathons in the United Kingdom
Recurring sporting events established in 2015
Recurring sporting events disestablished in 2017
Autumn events in England
Sports competitions in Somerset